Zaragoza–Delicias station is a railway station located in the city of Zaragoza in Aragon, Spain. The station opened on 7 May 2003, and the Central Bus Station Zaragoza opened on 5 May 2007, providing a wide intermodality to passengers. It is served by the AVE high-speed trains between Madrid and Barcelona and onwards to Figueres.

The building was designed by Carlos Ferrater and José María Valero.

Services

References

Madrid–Barcelona high-speed rail line
Transport in Zaragoza
Railway stations in Spain opened in 2003